Sir Hugo Drax is a fictional character created by author Ian Fleming for the 1955 James Bond  novel Moonraker. For the later film and its novelization, Drax was greatly altered from the novel by screenwriter Christopher Wood. In the film, Drax is portrayed by English/French actor Michael Lonsdale. In both the novel and film, Drax is the main antagonist.

Novel biography
In the novel Sir Hugo Drax is an English World War II soldier, believed to have been working in Liverpool harbour before the war, who became a post-war millionaire. He has red hair, and half of his face is badly scarred from a German attack during the war. The same incident left him with amnesia. He is 6 ft (183 cm) tall. After the war, Drax made a fortune from trading metals in Tangier and was able to start up his company, Drax Metals Ltd, which specialises and has a monopoly in the production of the metal ore columbite. Drax is also the backer of the 'Moonraker' missile project being built to defend the United Kingdom against its Cold War enemies. Alloys made from columbite have superior temperature resistance over conventional metals, allowing the Moonraker to burn hotter fuels in its engines and thus greatly increase its range.

The novel reveals that Drax was born in Germany as Graf Hugo von der Drache. Because his mother was English, Von der Drache was educated in England until the age of 12. Afterwards he moved to Berlin and later Leipzig, where he continued and finished his education. After graduating, he joined the Nazi Party and entered the Wehrmacht as a soldier in the Panzer Brigade 150. At the outset of World War II he took part in the Blitzkrieg campaigns in Belgium and France, before becoming a Skorzeny Werwolf commando. After the Ardennes offensive he stayed behind Allied lines when their forces crossed the Rhine and started operating in the Low Countries with his commando group. During a mission, he dressed as a British soldier so that he could sabotage and destroy a farmhouse holding a mixed liaison group of American and British servicemen, but he ended up at the same farm after being attacked by his own fighter because he was wearing a British uniform. While he was still conscious, he managed to destroy his motorbike and documents. Later he was found and brought to the farm, so he was caught in the explosion and nearly killed. He was then rescued by the British and nursed back to health, faking amnesia and claiming to be a "missing soldier" by the name of Hugo Drax. After receiving his medical discharge from the British Army, he killed a Jewish businessman in London, robbed him of £15,000, and escaped to Tangier to start his company.

Drax sets up the "Moonraker" missile project under the pretence of test-firing it into the North Sea. His workers are former Nazis, including most of the members of his old commando unit, and his true aim is to establish German superiority over England. To that end, he has the missile fitted with a nuclear warhead (provided by the Soviets) and changes the flight plan to target London. Drax uses his knowledge of the impending disaster to play the currency exchange market, planning to make a huge profit from his own terrorist act. Bond, with the help of Special Branch agent Gala Brand, sabotages Drax's missile launch and targets the North Sea again. A Soviet submarine picks up Drax and his workers as part of their escape, but the vessel is destroyed by the blast of the nuclear warhead as it passes through the target area.

Inspiration
The novel involved the idea of the "traitor within" throughout the course of the book. Drax, real name Graf Hugo von der Drache, is a "megalomaniac German Nazi who masquerades as an English gentleman", while his assistant, Krebs, bears the same name as Adolf Hitler's last Chief of Staff. In using a German as the novel's main enemy, "Fleming ... exploits another British cultural antipathy of the 1950s. Germans, in the wake of World War II, made another easy and obvious target for bad press." Moonraker uses two dictatorships that Fleming hated - the Nazis and the Soviets - as villains: Drax is German and works for the Soviets, who provide him with not only the atomic bomb, but the support and logistics to use it.

Fleming used aspects of his private life to create Drax; Fleming named the character after an acquaintance Admiral Sir Reginald Plunkett-Ernle-Erle-Drax. Other elements of the plot came from Fleming's knowledge of wartime operations carried out by T-Force, a secret British Army unit formed to continue the work of 30 Assault Unit, itself created by Fleming.

Film biography
In the film adaptation, Hugo Drax is a billionaire who owns Drax Industries, a private company which constructs Space Shuttles for NASA. Though Drax lives in California, he resides in a fully authentic French chateau that was disassembled at its original site, transported to the United States, and rebuilt stone by stone. Drax also supposedly owns the Eiffel Tower, but has not been able to secure a permit from the French government to export it out of the country. He portrays himself as an accomplished pianist, as evidenced by his recital of Chopin's "Raindrop" Prelude in D-flat major (op. 28) on his grand piano (which he plays in the key of D); in fact, he poses with a player piano in an attempt to impress his guests.

Bond follows a trail around the world to investigate the theft of a space shuttle that Drax had loaned to the UK. He begins his investigation in California at Drax Industries, and follows it to Italy, then to Brazil, then into space.

Drax reveals that he seeks to destroy the entire human race except for a small group of carefully selected humans, both male and female, that would leave Earth on six shuttles and have sanctuary on a space station in orbit over Earth. Using chemical weapons created by Drax's scientists—derived from the toxin of a rare South American plant, the Black Orchid—at an installation in Italy, he would wipe out the remainder of humanity. The biological agents were to be dispersed around the Earth from a series of 50 strategically placed globes, each containing enough toxin to kill 100 million people. After a period of time, when the chemical agents had become harmless, Drax and his master race would return to Earth to reinhabit the planet.

Bond obtains a sample of the chemical agent at the location in Italy. It leads him to a remote part of Brazil, where he finds Drax's shuttle-launch facility in an ancient civilization's shrine.

Bond and his companion, CIA agent Dr. Holly Goodhead, commandeer one of Drax's space shuttles and blast off to his orbiting space station. Bond persuades Drax's henchman Jaws to switch allegiances by getting Drax to reveal that Jaws and his girlfriend Dolly will be exterminated as "inferiors". A team of marines sent by the U.S. government invade the space station, resulting in a laser battle in which Drax's "master race" are all killed. Bond then corners Drax in the station's airlock, shoots him with a cyanide-tipped dart, and ejects him into space.

Henchmen
Jaws - changed sides and survived
Chang - thrown through a clock face by Bond, landing in a piano
Tree Sniper - shot by Bond
Corrine Dufour - eaten by Drax's dogs
Samuel - unknown
Blonde Beauty - presumed killed during destruction of the space station
Museum Guide - presumed killed during destruction of the space station
La Signorina del Mateo - presumed killed during destruction of the space station
Paramedic - strapped to a stretcher and sent crashing head first into a billboard
Mademoiselle Deladier - presumed killed during destruction of the space station
Countess Labinsky - presumed killed during destruction of the space station
Lady Victoria Devon - presumed killed during destruction of the space station
Cavendish - survived
Fraser - survived
Dolly - fell in love with Jaws and survived
Innumerable foot-soldiers clad in sporty lemon-yellow spacesuits with black stripes
Italian gangsters in Venice

Novelization
In his novelization of the movie, screenwriter Christopher Wood describes Drax as red-haired and with a face scarred and botched by poor plastic surgery (from a time "before he could afford the best in the world"), much as originally envisioned by Fleming. Although Drax's nationality is not specified, Bond idly wonders to himself which side he fought on during World War II.

Video games

 Hugo Drax appears as a playable character in GoldenEye 007 for the Nintendo Wii and GoldenEye 007: Reloaded for the Xbox 360 and PS3.

 Hugo Drax appears in 007 Legends during the Moonraker levels with Michael Lonsdale reprising his role.

See also
 List of James Bond villains
 Outline of James Bond

References

Bibliography

 
 
 

!colspan="3" style="background:#C1D8FF;"| Status
|- 
|  style="width:26%; text-align:center;"| Preceded byChristopher Lee
|  style="width:48%; text-align:center;"| Oldest living Bond villain actorPlayed by Michael LonsdaleJune 7, 2015 – September 21, 2020
|  style="width:26%; text-align:center;"| Succeeded byJulian Glover

Bond villains
Fictional Nazi fugitives
Fictional World War II veterans
Fictional businesspeople
Fictional crime bosses
Fictional smugglers
Fictional socialites
Fictional French people
Fictional German Army personnel
Moonraker (film)
Literary characters introduced in 1955
Fictional characters with disfigurements
Bioterrorism in fiction
Fictional contract bridge players
Fictional terrorists
Male literary villains
Male film villains
Action film villains
Film supervillains